Emanuele Taglietti (born 1943) is an Italian illustrator, mostly known for his covers for  digest-sized, adult comics whose themes were sex, violence, and horror.

Biography
Emanuele Taglietti was born in 1943 in Ferrara, Emilia-Romagna, Italy. His father, Otello, was a painter and a decorator. In the 1960s, Otello Taglietti worked as a set designer on movies made by his cousin, acclaimed director Michelangelo Antonioni, who would often take Emanuele with him on the set.

After attending a local art school, Emanuele Taglietti studied design at the Experimental Centre of Cinematography, in Rome. He went on to work as decorator and assistant director in around thirty movies, including Federico Fellini's Juliet of the Spirits, Dino Risi's Dirty Weekend, and others.

By the early 1970s, the popularity in Italy of the digest-sized fumetti comics, whose themes were mostly sex, violence, and horror, was at its peak. Taglietti moved on to work as an illustrator for Edifumetto, the biggest publisher of fumetti in Italy. He painted more than 500 covers for such books as Zora the Vampire, Sukia, Mafia, 44 Magnum and Wallestein the Monster. At the time, Taglietti would often paint more than ten covers every month for Renzo Barbieri's publishing house. 

By the end of the 1980s, the comics' popularity started to weaken, and Taglietti left Edifumetto to work as an oil painter, as well as an evening-class teacher in decoration and the conservation of murals. When Taglietti asked to have his original works back from publisher Barbieri, in 1988, he was told that all the originals had been stolen and that tempera works used as covers for their adult comic series by publishing house Edifumetto were missing. The whereabouts of the art works was never clarified. An investigation undertaken by Taglietti and Alessandro Biffignandi, who also had his paintings stolen, had to be abandoned for financial reasons. In 2000, he retired from teaching, continuing to work as a murals and watercolour painter. In 2016 he started painting comic covers again for a company called Annexia as well taking up the odd illustration job.

Books

 
 Emanuele Taglietti by Luca Mencaroni. Mencaroni Editore (Bari, 2019),

See also
 Clandestine literature
 Erotic art
 Pulp magazine
 Sexual arousal

References

External links
 Official Blog
 Sample of works by Emanuele Taglietti 
 Interview, Korero Press website
 Spaghettifumetti

1943 births
Italian illustrators
Living people